Epophthalmia a genus of dragonflies in the family Macromiidae.

Species
The genus contains the following species:

References

Macromiidae
Anisoptera genera
Taxa named by Hermann Burmeister